is the Japanese transliteration of the Sanskrit word bodhisattva. It is shortened from the literary 菩提薩埵 (bodaisatta).

References

Buddhism in Japan

ja:菩薩